HD 66920, also known as HR 3171, is a solitary, white hued star located in the southern circumpolar constellation Volans, the flying fish. It has an apparent magnitude of 6.33, placing it near the limit for naked eye visibility. Based on parallax measurements from the Gaia spacecraft, the star is estimated to be 428 light years distant. Pauzen et al. (2001) listed it as a λ Boötis star, but is now considered a non member.

HD 66920 has a classification of A3 V, indicating that it is an ordinary A-type main-sequence star. Although it has been classified as a giant star (III), HR 3171 is still on the main sequence (according to Gaia DR3 models). HD 66920 has a solar metallicity, and is estimated to be 711 million years old.

References 

Volans (constellation)
CD-72 00431
3171
066920
039041
Volantis, 20
A-type main-sequence stars